"Anaconda" is a song by rapper Nicki Minaj from her third studio album, The Pinkprint (2014). Released on August 4, 2014 by Young Money Entertainment, Cash Money Records, and Republic Records as the second single from the album, the song was produced by Polow da Don, DJ Spydr, and Da Internz, and prominently samples "Baby Got Back" (1992) by Sir Mix-a-Lot. The song peaked at number two on the US Billboard Hot 100, becoming Minaj's highest charting single at the time. The song also peaked within the top ten in Australia, Canada, Ireland, New Zealand and the United Kingdom, top forty in Austria, France and Portugal and top fifty in Czech Republic.

Colin Tilley directed an accompanying video for the song, which was released on August 19, 2014. Following the video's release, it broke the 24-hour streaming record on Vevo by accumulating 19.6 million views in its first day of release. In 2021, Anaconda became first music video for a solo female rap song to hit 1 billion views.  To further promote the song, Minaj performed it live at the 2014 MTV Video Music Awards and also performed it at Fashion Rocks and the iHeartRadio Music Festival. "Anaconda" was nominated for Best Rap Song at the 2015 Grammy Awards. The song was also nominated for two categories at the 2015 MTV Video Music Awards, Best Female Video and Best Hip-Hop Video, winning the latter.

Background and composition
On August 5, 2014, producer Polow da Don claimed that the "Anaconda" instrumental was originally intended for rapper and musician Missy Elliott, but was scrapped and then re-recorded by Minaj. However, on August 24, 2014, Elliott contradicted Polow's recollections, saying she never received the instrumental. The cover art for the single went viral on the web after being revealed. On various digital music stores, the cover art is censored with the Parental Advisory label over Minaj's buttocks. The song heavily samples "Baby Got Back" by Sir Mix-a-Lot, who also has vocals in the chorus of the song.

The song has been viewed by some as a diss track, in answer to "Baby Got Back". Whereas Sir Mix-a-Lot focuses on a woman's body and the pleasure it gives him, Minaj raps from the perspective of the unnamed woman, and shows how she uses her body to profit and empower herself.

According to Minaj's sound engineer Aubry "Big Juice" Delaine, "Anaconda" had 27 different versions at first. Production team Da Internz were then brought in to add drums to the song, whereafter it was sent for mixing and mastering, which made it "perfect".

Musically, the song is a hip hop and pop-rap song. The song is written in the key of C minor with a tempo of 130 beats per minute.

Critical reception

Carolyn Menyes from Music Times said it is a bit "raunchy" though this was "expected" and saying "Anaconda" continues Minaj's promise to move away from her poppier singles such as "Super Bass" and "Starships", and go back to her hardcore rap roots. Kory Grow from Rolling Stone praised the use of the "Baby Got Back" sample and said the song stayed true to the theme of the original. Kevin Goddard from HotNewHipHop said "Nicki's raunchy new version may be the next big thing to hit the industry." Dan Reilly from Spin said "Minaj takes the good Sir's '92 ode to protruding posteriors and adds a heavy dose of 2014 sex lingo." Amy Davidson from Digital Spy gave the song three stars out of five and said that "Nicki's breaking down barriers."

Sir Mix-a-Lot said he had "a whole new level of respect for Minaj" after hearing the record and that he became a "fan for life".

The song made Spin's end of year 'The 101 Best Songs of 2014' list. It ranked #3 on the list of 101 entries and Spin herald it "much more than just a song" but a "cultural movement." She was the only rapper to make the top ten of the list as a lead artist. "Anaconda" was also placed at number two on MTV's Best Songs of 2014.

However, despite the positive reviews the song received negative reactions. The London Economic called it "one of the worst songs ever." Critics from National Review referred to the song as "degrading," adding that it promoted prostitution, drug abuse and immorality to young girls. A city in Israel banned the song and prohibited it from concerts and sports events. They claimed the record is "violations of women's dignity," encouraged "a culture of rape and humiliation of women," and that its lyrics were "full of racist words, insults, sexism and homophobia."

Commercial performance
In the United States, the song debuted at No. 3 on the Digital Songs chart selling 141,000 digital downloads in its first week. Additionally, as Minaj shares lead credit on "Bang Bang," which was No. 2 on that same chart in the same week, Minaj became the first lead act to have two concurrent songs in the top three of the chart since Taylor Swift did it on the list dated September 22, 2012. On the Billboard Hot 100, the song debuted at No. 19, marking Minaj's 51st Hot 100 entry and subsequently breaking out of a tie with Michael Jackson for overall career Hot 100 entries.

For the week ending September 6, 2014, "Anaconda" jumped 39-2 on the Hot 100, blocked from the top spot by Swift's "Shake It Off". It became Minaj's highest charting single on that chart at the time. It marked her eleventh top ten single. Its leap into the runner-up position was brought on primarily by the release of its music video, which garnered 32.1 million domestic streams in its first week. That streaming total caused it to consequentially skyrocket 42-1 on Billboards Streaming Songs chart. It is the largest one week streaming sum since Miley Cyrus' "Wrecking Ball" received 36.4 million streams for the week ending September 28, 2013. Additionally, the 39-2 ascent for "Anaconda" marks the second-biggest jump ever within the Hot 100's top 40. Only Black Eyed Peas made a bigger leap in the region when "Boom Boom Pow" blasted 39-1 on April 18, 2009. "Anaconda" was certified double platinum by the Recording Industry Association of America (RIAA) in November 2014 and has sold 1.3 million copies in the US as of December 2014.

Music video
A music video for the track was shot in Los Angeles, California. It was directed by Colin Tilley and was released on August 19, 2014. The video features a cameo appearance by fellow rapper and labelmate Drake. The video broke the 24-hour streaming record on Vevo by accumulating 19.6 million views in its first day of release, beating the 19.3 million 24-hour record previously held by Miley Cyrus for the music video of her song, "Wrecking Ball", in 2013. On August 30, 2014, eleven days after the release of the music video, "Anaconda" was Vevo certified for receiving over 100 million views. In 2015 Taylor Swift surpassed Minaj's record with the video for her single "Bad Blood" which got 20.1 million views in 24 hours.

In a review of Minaj's video, Lucas Villa of AXS wrote, "It's butts abound in her bananas clip for 'Anaconda." NBC host Al Roker called the music video "vile" and "desperate". Roker said, "It almost seems like Minaj has gotten desperate and needs to do something to get her crown back." Molly Lambert of Grantland was complimentary, writing "the video is about Nicki asserting her power, not as a sexual object but a sexual subject." It was named one of the sexiest videos of 2014 by VH1.

As of April 3, 2021, the video has gained more than 1 billion views, being the first female rap solo song to do so. Billboard also named "Anaconda" the 13th greatest video of the decade.

Live performances
On 24 August 2014, Minaj first performed the song live at the 2014 MTV Video Music Awards. The performance followed Ariana Grande's individual performance of her single "Break Free" and was followed by a performance of Jessie J, Grande, and Minaj's joint single "Bang Bang." On September 9, 2014, Minaj performed the song live at Fashion Rocks. On September 19, 2014, Minaj performed the song at the 2014 iHeartRadio Music Festival. On November 9, 2014, Minaj performed "Anaconda" at the 2014 MTV Europe Music Awards in a three-song medley including her other songs "Super Bass" and "Bed of Lies" featuring Skylar Grey. Minaj has performed the song on The Pinkprint Tour and The Nicki Wrld Tour.

Usage in media
The song has been played and referenced several times on The Ellen DeGeneres Show, including Ellen DeGeneres doing a music video parody of the song which was unveiled during Minaj's appearance on the show in 2014.

The Fine Brothers released two videos on their YouTube channel of teens reacting to "Anaconda", and elders reacting to "Anaconda". They later made a song out of the reactions and released it for purchase on iTunes.

The song was briefly sung by a group of bunnies in the 2016 movie, Sing. Due to the explicit lyrics of the song, they only sang the lines, "Oh, my, gosh. Look at her butt". A remix of the line was released on the deluxe version of the Sing: Original Motion Picture Soundtrack and was entitled "OH. MY. GOSH."

The song was used as the first "lip-sync for your legacy" song on the third season of RuPaul's Drag Race: All Stars. As the two challenge winners, contestants Aja and BenDeLaCreme lip-synced to the song, with BenDeLaCreme winning.

Credits and personnel
Recording
Recorded at Glenwood Recording Studios, Burbank, California

Personnel
Songwriting – Onika Tanya Maraj, Jamal Jones, Jonathan Solone-Myvett, Ernest Clark, Marcos Palacios, Anthony Ray
Production  – Polow da Don, Anonymous, 
Co-production – Da Internz, Eric Bellinger
Recording – Aubry "Big Juice" Delaine
Mixing – Jaycen Joshua
Mixing assistant — Ryan Kaul
Mastering – Chris Athens

Charts

Weekly charts

Year-end charts

Certifications

Release history

See also
 List of number-one R&B/hip-hop songs of 2014 (U.S.)
 List of UK R&B Chart number-one singles of 2014
 Cultural history of the buttocks

References

2014 songs
2014 singles
Cash Money Records singles
Dirty rap songs
Hip house songs
Music videos directed by Colin Tilley
Nicki Minaj songs
Republic Records singles
Song recordings produced by Polow da Don
Songs written by Nicki Minaj
Songs written by Polow da Don
Song recordings produced by Da Internz
Obscenity controversies in music
2014 controversies
Music video controversies
Young Money Entertainment singles
Songs written by Sir Mix-a-Lot
Miami bass songs